MyBudget is an Australian financial services company based in Adelaide, Australia, which provides personal budget management services including through an app.

History

MyBudget was founded in 1999 by Australian entrepreneur and personal finance expert Tammy Barton. During one of her first jobs at a legal firm Barton noticed there was a lack of assistance for people struggling with the damaging effects of financial stress. Using this as inspiration for MyBudget, Barton decided to help them herself and built the business from her kitchen table. Barton’s main motivation was to help individuals improve their financial position by formulating a tailored budget and by managing their finances on their behalf. The first office was located in Adelaide, South Australia. MyBudget was listed as number 52 on the BRW Fast 100 list 2009 and number 37 on the BRW Fast 100 list 2010. In 2007, BRW magazine announced that MyBudget had grown at an average rate of 50 percent each year since the company was founded. It also said that the service provided aided a variety of Australians from differing backgrounds.

Product
MyBudget provides a personal budgeting service. The service analyses a client's finances, from income to debts and finally their expenses. The budgeting system works by ranking each bill in order of priority, from those which are the highest, such as loan and mortgage repayments, to those with a lower priority, after charging its fee which averages $42 per week. Once this information has been collated, MyBudget then creates a complete working budget for the long-term for an individual or entire household.

Criticism and malware
In December 2013, MyBudget was named in a national current affairs television report as "profiteering at the expense of people who are struggling with debt". MyBudget issued a statement responding to the report, claiming that "the segment was an unbalanced attack on our industry and that many of the comments made are inaccurate".

In 2017, MyBudget was the object of a class action due to withholding interest accrued by clients. In September 2018, the courts dismissed the proceedings, with Judge Lee stating that "MyBudget obtains and suffers the pluses and minuses of the bank accounts necessary to discharge its obligations to provide the services," and, in addition, "The Provision did not cause an overall detriment, financial or otherwise, to clients".

In May 2020, MyBudget was the confirmed target of a malware attack as a result of the company quickly moving its employees onto work-from-home arrangements amid the coronavirus outbreak. Automatic transfers were interrupted, but progressed manually. Customers expressed concerns as to whether the significant personal data held by MyBudget had been leaked or hacked.  Later, hackers claimed to have stolen data from MyBudget using ransomware and threatened to publish it unless paid.   During the ransomware attack "users were unable to view their account balance for at least seven days." In a statement to the media on 15 May 2020, MyBudget stated that there was "no credible evidence that significant data was accessed or will be misused [h]owever we can't rule this out and are taking all cautionary measures".

References

Personal finance
Financial services companies established in 1999
1999 establishments in Australia